Adrej is a commune in Sefrou Province, Fès-Meknès, Morocco. At the time of the 2004 census, the commune had a population of 2,236 living in 479 households.

References

Populated places in Sefrou Province
Rural communes of Fès-Meknès